The Amazonas National Forest is a national forest in the state of Amazonas, Brazil.

Location

The Amazonas National Forest  is in the municipalities of Barcelos and Santa Isabel do Rio Negro in the state of Amazonas.

The forest is in the Upper Rio Negro region along the border of Brazil and Venezuela and the border between the states of Amazonas and Roraima.
It is bordered to the west by the Pico da Neblina National Park.
Most of the forest is within the Yanomami Indigenous Territory.
The conservation unit would be included in the proposed Northern Amazon Ecological Corridor.
The vegetation is mainly dense rainforest (93%) but includes open rainforest (2%), campinarana (2%) and areas of contact between Campinarana and dense rainforest (3%).

Conservation

The Amazonas National Forest is administered by ICMBio.
It is classed as IUCN protected area category VI (protected area with sustainable use of natural resources) with the objective of sustainable multiple use of forest resources and scientific research, with emphasis on methods for sustainable exploitation of native forests.

The Instituto Socioambiental (ISA) has noted that the national forest, with its goal of sustainable forestry, conflicts with the goals of the Indigenous Territories with which it overlaps.
In these territories the indigenous people have the exclusive right of use according to their customs and traditions.
The ISA stated in August 2011 that for this reason the Amazonas National Forest should be repealed.

Notes

Sources

National forests of Brazil
Protected areas of Amazonas (Brazilian state)
Amazon basin
1989 establishments in Brazil
Protected areas established in 1989